The Central Owenton Historic District in Owenton, Kentucky is a  historic district which was listed on the National Register of Historic Places in 1984.  The listing included 18 contributing buildings.

It included the Owen County Courthouse and Jail, which were already separately listed on the National Register.

The district includes roughly Bryan, Madison, Seminary, and Thomas Streets.

References

Historic districts on the National Register of Historic Places in Kentucky
National Register of Historic Places in Owen County, Kentucky
Buildings and structures completed in 1890